Karl Johnson (birth unknown), is a New Zealand rugby league footballer who currently plays for the Gladstone Past Brothers. He is a New Zealand Māori international.

Playing career
A Waiheke Rams junior, Johnson played for the Northcote Tigers and North Harbour Tigers in the Bartercard Cup between 2002 and 2004 and also represented Auckland in 2004. Johnson was a Junior Kiwi and represented New Zealand 'A'.

In 2006 Johnson played for the North Sydney Bears in the NSWRL Premier League. After being the leading try scorer in the competition he signed a two-year deal with the North Queensland Cowboys in August that year. Johnson was named the '2006 North Sydney Player of the Year'.

He then played Reserve Grade for the Newcastle Knights before joining the Central Comets in the Queensland Cup in 2008. That year he was named in the Queensland Residents.

In 2011 Johnston joined the Past Brothers club in Gladstone.

References

External links
Central Comets profile

Living people
Auckland rugby league team players
Central Queensland Capras players
New Zealand rugby league players
New Zealand Māori rugby league players
New Zealand Māori rugby league team players
North Sydney Bears NSW Cup players
North Harbour rugby league team players
Northcote Tigers players
People from Waiheke Island
Junior Kiwis players
Rugby league centres
Rugby league players from the Auckland Region
Rugby league second-rows
Year of birth missing (living people)